Stonyhurst College is a co-educational Roman Catholic independent school, adhering to the Jesuit tradition, on the Stonyhurst Estate, Lancashire, England. It occupies a Grade I listed building. The school has been fully co-educational since 1999. It is a public school in the British sense of the term.

A precursor institution of the college was founded in 1593 by Father Robert Persons SJ at St Omer, at a time when penal laws prohibited Roman Catholic education in England. After moving to Bruges in 1762 and Liège in 1773, the college was headed for oblivion, but for the generosity of an old boy, Thomas Weld (of Lulworth) who intervened. Weld's enormous benefaction enabled the expatriated school to establish itself on English soil in 1794 when it was granted the Stonyhurst estate. It provides boarding and day education to approximately 450 boys and girls aged 13–18. On an adjacent site, its preparatory school, St Mary's Hall, provides education for boys and girls aged 3–13.

The school combines an academic curriculum with extra-curricular pursuits. Roman Catholicism plays a central role in college life, with emphasis on both prayer and service, according to the Jesuit philosophy.

The school's alumni include three Saints, twelve Beati, seven archbishops, seven Victoria Cross winners, a Peruvian president, a Bolivian president, a New Zealand prime minister, a signatory of the American Declaration of Independence and several writers, sportsmen, and politicians.

History

Stonyhurst Hall

The earliest deed concerning the Stanihurst is held in the college's Arundell Library; it dates from approximately 1200. In 1372, a licence was granted to John de Bayley for an oratory on the site. His descendants, the Shireburn family, completed the oldest portion of the extant buildings. Richard Shireburn began building the hall, which was enlarged by his grandson Nicholas who also constructed the ponds, avenue and gardens. Following his death, the estate passed to his wife and then to sole heir, their daughter, Mary, the Duchess of Norfolk.

Great benefactor emerges
In 1754, it was inherited by her cousin, Edward Weld (Senior) (1705-1761), the subject of controversy and two trials, one for impotency. After his death it passed to Weld's eldest son, also Edward. Unfortunately, this Edward (1740-1775), who was to be Maria Fitzherbert's obscure first husband, fell off his horse three months after the wedding and not having had time to sign the will before he died of his injuries, the estate passed to Edward senior's third son and Edward's youngest brother, Thomas. Thomas Weld (1750-1810) and his wife had many children and great swathes of land which he distributed among his progeny.

The college

The story of the school may be traced back to establishments in St Omer in what was then the Spanish Netherlands in 1593, where a college, under the Royal Patronage of Philip II of Spain, was founded by Fr Robert Persons SJ for English boys unable to receive a Catholic education in Elizabethan England. As such it was one of several expatriate English schools operating on the European mainland. In 1762, the Jesuits were forced to flee and re-established their school at Bruges. The school was moved in 1773 to Liège, where it operated for two decades before moving to Stonyhurst on 29 August 1794.  Schooling resumed on 22 October that year.

The college flourished during the 19th century: the Society of Jesus was re-established in Britain at Stonyhurst in 1803, and over the century, student numbers rose from the original twelve migrants from Liège. By the turn of the following century, it had become England's largest Roman Catholic college. Stonyhurst Hall underwent extensive alterations and additions to accommodate these numbers; the Old South Front was constructed in 1810, only to be demolished and replaced with much grander buildings in the 1880s. A seminary was constructed on the estate, and an observatory and meteorological station erected in the gardens. The 20th century saw the gradual hiring of a mostly lay staff, as the number of Jesuits declined. The seminary at St Mary's Hall was closed, and the school discontinued its education of university-aged philosophers. With the closure of Beaumont College in 1967 and the transfer away from the Society of Jesus of Mount St Mary's College, Spinkhill, Derbyshire, in 2006, Stonyhurst became the sole Jesuit public school in England.

Since the Second World War, the buildings have been refurbished or developed. Additions include new science buildings in the 1950s and 1960s, a new boarding wing in the 1960s, a new swimming pool in the 1980s and Weld House in 2010. The school became fully co-educational in 1999.

Hodder Place, St Mary's Hall and Hodder House

The original preparatory school to Stonyhurst, Hodder Place, came into the hands of the Jesuits as part of the estate donated by alumnus Thomas Weld. Originally used as a novitiate, it became a preparatory school to the college in 1807.

St Mary's Hall, on an adjoining site to Stonyhurst, was built as a Jesuit seminary in 1828 (extended in the 1850s) and functioned until 1926, when the seminarians moved to Heythrop Hall. The poet Gerard Manley Hopkins, and John Tolkien, son of J. R. R. Tolkien, trained as priests there. During World War II, the English College left Benito Mussolini's Italy and occupied the hall. After their return to Rome, St Mary's Hall opened as a middle school in 1946. At the same time, Hodder Place continued to educate those aged eight to eleven, until its closure and conversion into flats in 1970. Hodder Place pupils moved up to St Mary's Hall to form Hodder Playroom. As successor to Hodder Place, St Mary's Hall has a claim to being the oldest surviving preparatory school in Britain.

In 2004, the old gymnasium at St Mary's Hall was converted into new nursery and infant facilities named Hodder House, for those aged three to seven.

Religious life

The college is Roman Catholic and has had a significant place in English Catholic history for many centuries (including controversial events such as the Popish Plot and Gunpowder Plot conspiracies). It was founded initially to educate English Catholics on the continent in the hope that, through them, Roman Catholicism might be restored in England.

Finally, the school settled in England in 1794 and the Society of Jesus was officially re-established in Britain in 1803. Stonyhurst remained the headquarters of the English Province until the middle of the century; by 1851, a third of the Province's Jesuits were based there. Until the 1920s, Jesuit priests were trained on site in what is today the preparatory school. There was a drop in vocations after World War I and the seminary was closed. The number of Jesuits teaching at Stonyhurst fell to a third of the staff within a decade. Since then, the Jesuit presence has been in decline, but the school continues to place Roman Catholicism and Jesuit philosophy at its core under the guidance of a Jesuit-led chaplaincy team and the involvement of the Jesuits in its governance.

Chapels
The school has one main church, St Peter's, and five chapels: the Boys' Chapel, the Chapel of the Angels, the Sodality Chapel, the St Francis Chapel and the St Ignatius Chapel. The last two are both within the towers of St Peter's Church, and are not normally used by pupils. The Sodality Chapel is the home of the relics of the 3rd-century Roman convert St Gordianus. The Jesuits brought his remains from the College of St Omer and held them beneath the altar since 1859. His bones were temporarily removed in 2006 while the chapel underwent restoration, but they have since been returned. The chapel is again used by the re-established Sodality. Adjacent to the Old Infirmary is the Rosary Garden, a place for spiritual contemplation, at the centre of which is a stone statue of the Blessed Virgin Mary.

St Peter's Church underwent extensive repair and refurbishment in 2010–11. Most of the Victorian stencilling was not restored, although the whitewash was removed from the stencilling above the altar.

Traditions
It is a long-standing practice, as with many Jesuit schools around the world, that pupils write A.M.D.G. in the top left hand corner of any piece of work they do. It stands for the Latin phrase Ad Majorem Dei Gloriam which means For the Greater Glory of God. At the end of a piece of work they write L.D.S. in the centre of the page. It stands for Laus Deo Semper which means Praise to God Always. These are both traditional Jesuit mottoes.

Charitable status

As a registered charity, Stonyhurst is obliged to provide benefits to the wider community under the terms of the Charities Act 2006. As such, the college is home to the local Catholic parish church, which receives worshippers from Hurst Green every day. Its sports facilities, including the swimming pool and all-weather pitch are available for public use; the latter was used for competitors training for the London 2012 Olympic Games. Much of the estate has public access; in particular the gardens and tea house are visited during the summer months, while the college plays host to tours, antiques fairs, food festivals, music concerts, conferences and weddings. The school has relationships with several state schools, arranging shared activities with their pupils, in particular those serving special needs children. In addition, the school makes available some places to pupils offered on scholarship, bursaries or free of charge; almost a third of current pupils receive financial support for their places.

Motto
The French motto Quant Je Puis (As Much as I Can) is central to the ethos of the school, which focuses upon the all-round development of the individual. It is inherited from the Shireburn family who once owned the original mansion on the site; the family emblem is emblazoned, in stone, with the motto, above the fireplace in the Top Refectory. At the far end of the same room, once the dining room of the Shireburns, the motto can be seen again, carved into the minstrel's gallery: Quant Je Puis. Hugo Sherburn armig. me fieri fecit. Anno Domini 1523. Et sicut fuit sic fiat.

Academic
Academic standards are high: 93% of GCSE students attain A*-C grades; there is a 100% pass rate at A-Level; and 100% of A-Level leavers take up places at universities (10% to Oxbridge) or on gap year schemes. The school's most recent inspection rated much of the education and pastoral provision as 'outstanding'.

Ten GCSEs are usually taken by each pupil, consisting of five compulsory subjects (Religious Studies, Mathematics, English Language and Literature, and a modern language (French, German or Spanish) plus Information Technology and Personal, Social Education, with five other options from humanities, sciences, or arts subjects. In Poetry (lower sixth), four or five AS-Levels are taken from a choice of 25 subjects, with a weekly Theology class. One of these may be dropped and the remainder, or all, taken on to A-Level. Six A* – C grades are the requirement for Sixth Form entry. Each academic department has dedicated teaching rooms around the school, in addition to the general classrooms and playroom study places.

Education during the college's early history was based on St Ignatius' Ratio Studiorum, with emphasis upon theology, classics and science, all of which still feature prominently in the curriculum. The educational practice, observed at the College of St Omer, of dividing a class into Romans and Carthaginians continued long after the migration to Stonyhurst but is not employed today; each pupil would be pitched against an opponent with the task of picking up on the other's mistakes in an attempt to score points.

Until Roman Catholics were admitted to Oxbridge in 1854, Stonyhurst was also home to "philosopher gentlemen" studying BA courses under the London Matriculation Examination system. Their numbers began to fall after 1894 and the department was closed in 1916.

Libraries and collections

Libraries

Stonyhurst College has four main libraries: the Arundell, the Bay, the Square and the More (dedicated to Saint Thomas More).

The More Library is the main library for students while the 'House Libraries' (the Arundell, the Bay, and the Square) contain many artefacts from the Society of Jesus and English Catholicism. The Arundell Library, presented in 1837 by Everard, 11th Baron Arundell of Wardour, is the most significant; it is not only a country-house library from Wardour Castle but also has a notable collection of 250 incunabula, medieval manuscripts and volumes of Jacobite interest, signal among which is Mary Tudor's Book of Hours, which it is believed was given by Mary, Queen of Scots to her chaplain on the scaffold. The manuscript Le Livre de Seyntz Medicines was written in 1354 by Henry, Duke of Lancaster. To these were added the archives of the English Province of the Society of Jesus, which include 16th-century manuscript verses by St Robert Southwell SJ, the letters of St Edmund Campion SJ (1540–81) and holographs of the 19th-century poet Gerard Manley Hopkins. The Arundell Library has a copy of the Chronicles of Jean Froissart, captured at the Battle of Agincourt in 1415, and held the 7th-century Stonyhurst Gospel of St John before it was loaned to the British Library, as well as a First Folio of Shakespeare.

Collections

Among those collections kept away from public view are numerous blood-soaked garments from Jesuits martyred in Japan, the skull of Cardinal Morton, ropes used to quarter St Edmund Campion SJ, hair of St Francis Xavier SJ, an enormous solid silver jewel-encrusted monstrance, the Wintour vestments, a cope made for Henry VII, and a thorn said to be from the crown of thorns placed upon Jesus' head at the crucifixion.

The school owns paintings, including a portrait of Tsar Nicholas I of Russia and another of the Jesuit Henry Garnet. In the Stuart Parlour are portraits of Jacobites including James Francis Edward Stuart, and his sons Charles Edward Stuart and Henry Benedict Stuart. There are also several original engravings by Rembrandt and Dürer, such as the 'Greater Passion' and the 'Car of Maximillian'.

Observatory

The school has a functioning observatory which was built in 1866. An older observatory, built in 1838, is now the Typographia Collegii, but was once one of seven important stations in the country when the Meteorological Office came under the auspices of the Royal Society. The records of temperature taken there start from 1846 and are the oldest continuous daily records in the world. During the nineteenth century, the observatory was maintained by the astronomer priests, Fr Alfred Weld, Fr Perry and Fr Sidgreaves whose research included astronomy, geomagnetrometry and seismology. Astrophysicist Pietro Angelo Secchi, director of the Vatican Observatory, also taught astronomy at the college during the period. Sir Edward Sabine chose the observatory as one of his main stations when conducting a magnetic survey of Britain in 1858. Five years later Fr Sidgreaves began the first series of monthly geometric observations, which continued until May 1919. During the course of the twentieth century, the observatory fell out of use and its telescope, parts of which dated to the 1860s, was sold after the Second World War. When its private owner came to sell it, the college was able to buy it back and restore it to its original home. The observatory is today used for astronomical purposes again, whilst also functioning as one of four weather stations used by the Met Office to provide central England temperature data (CET).

"The observatory has been made famous by many astronomers of wide reputation," says Brittanica.

Arts

Music, drama and art
Music plays a prominent rôle in school life. All those entering the school in Lower Grammar (year nine) are obliged to learn to play an orchestral instrument. There are two choirs: the Chapel Choir, which sings regularly at mass, and the Schola Cantorum, composed of teachers and pupils, which sings at concerts and public events such as the May celebration in the college amphitheatre. Pupils participate in the school orchestra and various bands, whilst the staff band is a feature of the Poetry Banquet and Rhetoric Ball.

Drama is equally important, with plays staged throughout the school year, the main performance being at Great Academies, whilst some students take Theatre Studies as an additional AS Level subject. The college has a traditional theatre, the Academy Room, and a high-tech theatre built at St Mary's Hall as part of the Centenaries Appeal in 1993. The latter plays host to the annual Ribble Valley International Piano Week. Several former pupils have gone on to achieve success upon the stage, including OSCAR-winning actor and director Charles Laughton and BAFTA-winning director and producer Peter Glenville.

Art is an important part of the curriculum, and is compulsory for those in Lower Grammar (year nine). There is a dedicated art studio in addition to a separate design and technology centre. Student artwork is displayed on the walls of the Lower Gallery, including a portrait of the Queen painted by Isobel Bidwell during the Golden Jubilee year; upon receipt of a copy, the Queen's lady-in-waiting said that "The Queen was delighted to see the painting and know that it is on display in the school".

Literary associations
Stonyhurst has provided inspiration for poets and authors who include former classics teacher Gerard Manley Hopkins, whose poems feature details of the local countryside, and former pupil Sir Arthur Conan Doyle whose "Baskerville Hall" was modelled on Stonyhurst Hall, and who named Sherlock Holmes' nemesis, Moriarty, after a fellow pupil. J. R. R. Tolkien wrote part of The Lord of the Rings in a classroom on the Upper Gallery during his stay at the college where his son taught Classics; his "Middle-earth" is said to resemble the local area, while there are specific resonances in names such as "Shire Lane", (the name of a road in Hurst Green) and the "River Shirebourn" (the Shireburns built Stonyhurst). Poet Laureate Alfred Austin, and the poet Oliver St John Gogarty ("Stately plump Buck Mulligan" in James Joyce's Ulysses) were educated at the school, (as were the sons of Oscar Wilde and Evelyn Waugh). George Archer-Shee, at the centre of Terence Rattigan's play The Winslow Boy, is an alumnus.

The school runs its own publication company, St Omer's Press, which publishes religious literature, and first began when the college was located at St Omer in Flanders.

Sport
Pupils are required to participate in games on a regular basis. The school plays rugby union and other sports. Since turning fully co-educational, hockey and rounders have widened the sports programme.

Stonyhurst College Rugby Union Football Club (SCRUFC)
Rugby has played a big part in the life of the school, despite only supplanting football as the school's primary sport in 1921. All boys are encouraged to play when they enter Lower Grammar but are not required to play throughout their time at the school. Stonyhurst has a successful rugby season, with games well supported by pupils, staff and parents. Sporting rivalry is particularly prominent against fellow Catholic independent schools Ampleforth College, Mount St Mary's College and Sedbergh School in Cumbria. The Stonyhurst Sevens take place annually, attracting large crowds and teams from all over the country.

The school has produced sixteen international rugby players (England (5), Ireland (6), Scotland (1) Italy (1), the USA (1) Bermuda (1) and the Bahamas (1)), as well as players for the Barbarians and the British and Irish Lions. Most recently they include Iain Balshaw and Kyran Bracken, who both played for England when they won the 2003 Rugby World Cup, whilst another member of that team, Will Greenwood, went to Stonyhurst Saint Mary's Hall, where his mother taught maths until 2007. Current pupils of the school have won places to represent Spain, Mexico (under 19s) the Irish Exiles and the Welsh Exiles (under 19s). Old boys have also played at varsity level and have won blues for Oxford or Cambridge.

Stonyhurst has had well-known coaches, including former England coaches Ben Sanders, Dick Greenwood and Brian Ashton who coached the first XV.

Many pupils have represented Stonyhurst in the England Schools U16 and U18 Rugby teams.  These include Daniel Mckenzie and Andy Fuller who both received an U18 England cap in 2000.

Stonyhurst Football
Stonyhurst Football, inherited from the College of St Omer (along with Stonyhurst Cricket), was played between the handball walls on the Playground. The game was discontinued with the advent of association football but was re-established in 1988 when a "Grand Match" was played at Great Academies; traditionally a "Grand Match" was played on Shrove Tuesday and was the primary Stonyhurst Football match of the season. The teams were England vs France (although during the Crimean War England vs Russia was played and more recently England vs Ireland was played in the 1980s). The last game took place in 1995.

Rhetoric vs. Hodder cricket and rounders
Towards the end of the Summer Term each year, Rhetoric boys issue a challenge, written in Latin, to the boys in preparatory at Stonyhurst Saint Mary's Hall, inviting them to compete in a cricket match. Preparatory respond in turn, also in Latin. The Rhetoricians take part wearing fancy dress, and are traditionally defeated by preparatory. In 2003, the tradition was adopted by the girls who issued a Latin challenge to preparatory girls inviting them to compete at rounders.

Military

Officer Training Corps (OTC)
The Stonyhurst Officer Training Corps assembled for the first time on 16 October 1900, in the Ambulacrum, overseen by The First Volunteer Battalion, the East Lancashire Regiment who gave instruction in drill and musketry. The original uniform was scarlet with a white piping and slouch hat, which was changed to khaki before the First World War. The Corps was granted the honour of representation at the Coronation of 1910 and sent members to the Royal Review at Windsor in 1911. It also appeared on parade annually for the spectacle of the Corpus Christi celebrations until the practice became obsolete after Vatican II.

Combined Cadet Corps (CCF)
After the Second World War, school OTCs were succeeded by the Combined Cadet Force. Stonyhurst's is run from the College Armoury adjoining the Ambulacrum and Shooting Range, led by a team of officers under a Major assigned to the school. It meets weekly on a Thursday afternoon and comprises the following platoons named after Stonyhurst's seven Victoria Cross winners:

Junior company
Costello Platoon (Lieutenant Edmund William COSTELLO V.C., Malakand, India 1897)
Coury Platoon (Second Lieutenant George Gabriel COURY V.C., Guillemont, Somme 1916)
Liddell Platoon (Captain John Aiden LIDDELL V.C, Ostend, Belgium 1915)
Kenna Platoon (Captain Paul Aloysius KENNA V.C., Khartoum, Sudan 1898)

Senior company
Dease Platoon (Lieutenant Maurice James DEASE V.C., Mons, Belgium 1914)
Jackman Platoon (Captain James Joseph Bernard JACKMAN V.C., Ed Duda, Tobruk, 1941)
Andrews Platoon (Captain Harold Marcus ERVINE-ANDREWS V.C., Dunkirk 1940)
Support Platoon

Those in Grammar Playroom (year ten) are automatically enrolled in the CCF and are given the option of continuing at the end of the year, following a summer camp which takes place at a local barracks. Training involves a range of activities such as drill (marching and related manoeuvres), shooting, learning how to assemble and clean weapons, tactical planning and team work. The school supplies pupils with uniform, the orderliness of which is rigorously enforced and inspected each week. Each platoon is led by a Junior Under Officer, his sergeant and corporals who are sixth form students.

Military careers

In recent years, some pupils have gone on to receive places at the Royal Military Academy Sandhurst. This follows a long tradition of service from Stonyhurst pupils: many Old Stonyhurst (O.S.) were killed in the two World Wars and are commemorated on the war memorial at the end of the Upper Gallery.

The Stonyhurst War Records were published in their honour. A memorial at the top of the main staircase records the names of the six O.S. killed in the Boer War.

School organisation

Playroom system

Unlike most English public schools, Stonyhurst is organised horizontally by year groups (known as playrooms) rather than vertically by houses, although the girls are also split into junior and senior houses. Each playroom has an assigned playroom master, with each cohort moving through the playrooms, having a sequence of playroom masters (rather than a single housemaster).

The college has the following playrooms, following the Roman order of learning:

 Lower Grammar Playroom ('LG' 13–14)
 Grammar Playroom (14–15)
 Syntax Playroom (15–16, GCSE Year)
 Poetry Playroom (16–17)
 Rhetoric Playroom (17–18)

During the school's history the following playrooms or years have also existed:
 Philosophy 
 Upper Syntax
 Humanities
 Upper Grammar
 Middle Grammar

Lines
In addition to the horizontal division of the school into playrooms, there is also a vertical grouping which cuts through the year groups, the "lines", and is used mostly for competitive purposes in sport and music. The Lines and colours are as follows:
 Campion (Red) (named after St Edmund Campion)
 St Omers (Yellow, though Brown for sporting attire) (named after St Omer, the town the school was founded in)
 Shireburn (Green) (named after the Shireburn family which built Stonyhurst)
 Weld (Blue) (named after Thomas Weld who donated Stonyhurst to the Jesuits)

Notable events in the school year

The Ascensio Scholarum, inherited from the College of St Omer, in its present form, is the opening address of the headmaster at the beginning of the year to the entire school gathered in the Academy Room. Previously, it was a formal transition for pupils from one playroom to the next at the beginning of the year, which involved a pupil from each year announcing to the playroom of the year below them that the next playroom had been vacated by the senior pupils. The students and their belongings would then move up to their next playroom.

"Great Academies" takes place annually at the end of the first half of the summer term. Although different in its present form, it is a continuation of a tradition begun at St Omers, with the first taking place at Stonyhurst on 6 August 1795. Today, it is an occasion when the school is on display – there are exhibitions, musical performances, the school play, sporting events, as well as prize-giving and the headmaster's speech, culminating with the Rhetoric Ball and Rhetoric Mass the following morning.

Stonyhurst Association

After less formal arrangements had been made for many years, the Association was formed in 1879. Its primary objective is to foster a strong spirit of union amongst past pupils and friends of Stonyhurst, which has been achieved in a variety of ways reflecting the spirit of succeeding generations. Recently, there has been a strong charitable emphasis, embedded with similar developments at the college. This was formalised in 1985, when the Association was granted charitable status by the Charity Commission.  It also supports charities connected to the school including Eagle Aid.

Alumni

Stonyhurst has educated prominent individuals in every area, from statesmen to sportsmen, and actors to archbishops. Seven alumni have been awarded the Victoria Cross, the highest award for gallantry; paintings of them adorn the walls of the Top Refectory in the school.

Notable alumni include:
Charles Carroll of Carrollton, signatory of the U.S. Declaration of Independence
Arthur Conan Doyle, author of Sherlock Holmes
St Thomas Garnet SJ, canonised saint and protomartyr of St Omers, one of the Forty Martyrs of England and Wales
John Harbison, first State Pathologist of Ireland
Joseph Mary Plunkett, Irish signatory of the Irish Proclamation of Independence leading activist in the Easter Rising, for which he was executed
John Francis Moriarty, Attorney General for Ireland
Richard More O'Ferrall, Governor of Malta and Irish landownder.
Sir Frederick Weld, New Zealand prime minister
Eduardo Lopez de Romaña, president of Peru
Lieutenant Maurice James Dease, was the first posthumous recipient of the Victoria Cross during WWI, fought and died at the Battle of Mons
Thomas Meagher, Irish poet, leader of the Young Ireland movement, American Civil War Brigadier General, and Acting Governor of the Montana Territory. 
Daniel Carroll, brother of John and cousin of Charles, one of only five men to sign both the Articles of Confederation and the United States Constitution.
John Carroll, brother of Daniel and cousin of Charles, served as first bishop and archbishop in the United States, founder of Georgetown University. 
Contemporaries
Joe Ansbro, Scottish rugby international
Crispian Hollis, Bishop of Portsmouth
Michael D. Hurley, Cambridge don engaged in literature, philosophy and theology
Paul Johnson, writer, artist and popular historian
Professor Gabriel Leung, GBS, JP, Dean of the Li Ka Shing Faculty of Medicine, University of Hong Kong
Mark Thompson, former Director General of the BBC
Chris Morris, satirist, BAFTA winner
Tom Morris, theatre director, producer and writer, and Tony Award winner
Matt Greenhalgh, screenwriter, BAFTA winner
Tim Hetherington, photographer, Oscar nominee
Patrick Rock former government deputy director of policy for Prime Minister David Cameron and convicted sex offender*
Bill Cash, MP for Stone, Staffordshire and prominent Brexiteer
Patrick McGrath, novelist

Notable masters
Brian Ashton, history master and England rugby coach.
Dick Greenwood, Assistant bursar and England rugby coach.
Christopher Hollis, assistant master, history master (1925–1935), author, politician and president of the Oxford Union.
Gerard Manley Hopkins, classics master and poet.
Stephen Joseph Perry, astronomy master.
Alfred Weld SJ, director of the Observatory, grandson of founder Thomas Weld (of Lulworth)
Pietro Angelo Secchi, astronomy master, astrophysicist, and director of the Vatican Observatory.
George Tyrrell, philosophy master and Roman Catholic modernist.

Headmasters
Since the college's foundation in Flanders in 1593, there have been 78 headmasters, (variably known as presidents, rectors, superiors and directors). Until the appointment of Giles Mercer in 1985, the headmaster had always been a member of the Society of Jesus. There have been three lay headmasters.

 style="font-size:100%;"

St Omer, Bruges, Liège (1593–1794)

See: Heads of St Omer, Bruges, Liège

Stonyhurst (1794–present)

Presidents
Marmaduke Stone SJ (1794–1808)
Nicholas Sewall SJ (1808–1813)
John Weld SJ (1813–1816)
Nicholas Sewall SJ (1816–1817)

Rector and Headmaster
Charles Plowden SJ (1817–1819)
Joseph Tristram SJ (1819–1827)
Richard Norris SJ (1827–1832)
Richard Parker SJ (1832–1836)
John Brownbill SJ (1836–1839)
Francis Daniel SJ (1839–1841)
Andrew Barrow SJ (1841–1845)
Richard Norris SJ (1845–1846)
Henry Walmesley SJ (1846–1847)
Richard Sumner SJ (1847–1848)
Francis Clough SJ (1848–1861)
Joseph Johnson SJ (1861–1868)
Charles Henry SJ (1868–1869)
Edward Purbick SJ (1869–1879)

William Eyre SJ (1879–1885)
Reginald Colley SJ (1885–1891)
Herman Walmesley SJ (1891–1898)
Joseph Browne SJ (1898–1906)
Pedro Gordon SJ (1906–1907)
William Bodkin SJ (1907–1916)
Edward O'Connor SJ (1916–1924)
Walter Weld SJ (1924–1929)
Richard Worsley SJ (1929–1932)
Edward O'Connor SJ (1932–1938)
Leo Belton SJ (1938–1945)
Bernard Swindells SJ (1945–1952)
Francis Vavasour SJ (1952–1958)
Desmond Boyle SJ (1958–1961)

Headmasters
Frederick J. Turner SJ (1961–1963)
George Earle SJ (1963–1971)
Michael Bossy SJ (1971–1985)
Giles Mercer (1985–1996)
Adrian Aylward (1996–2006)
Andrew Johnson (2006-2016)
John Browne (2016-present)

Headmasters of Hodder Place & St Mary's Hall (1807–present)
See: Headmasters of Stonyhurst Saint Mary's Hall

Controversies
James Chaning-Pearce, a priest who taught at the school, was gaoled for sexually assaulting pupils between 1987 and 1995. The youngest victim was a boy of 12. In 1999, the Lancashire Constabulary conducted "Operation Whiting", which looked into allegations of abuse at the school dating back to the 1970s. This resulted in two convictions, one of which was quashed on appeal. On 14 May 2002, a parliamentary committee member described the operation as "a scandal in itself" and an "expensive... fiasco".

Another priest, Father Paul Symonds, at Stonyhurst between 1972 and 1979, was arrested in November 2009 for having allegedly abused a 13-year-old boy for three years. The case was dropped by the CPS Lancashire, a year later and was revealed in March 2014.

In 2014, Stonyhurst was fined £100,000 and ordered to pay £31,547.78 in legal costs for the prosecution after pleading guilty to a breach of the Health and Safety at Work etc Act 1974 for health and safety failings after a stonemason working for the college developed silicosis, a potentially fatal lung disease. The college made the stonemason, who had worked for the college for almost 12 years, redundant, four months after his diagnosis.

See also

 List of Jesuit sites in the United Kingdom
 List of Jesuit schools
 St Gordianus, interred in the school
 Listed buildings in Aighton, Bailey and Chaigley

References

Further reading
 Chadwick, Hubert, S.J. (1962), St Omers to Stonyhurst, (Burns & Oats), No ISBN
 Walsh, R.R. (1989), Stonyhurst War Record 1935–45 (T.H.C.L. Blackburn), 
 Muir, T.E. (2006) Stonyhurst, (St Omers Press, Gloucestershire) second edition, 
 Kirby, Henry L. and Walsh, R. Raymond (1987), The Seven V.C.s of Stonyhurst College, (T.H.C.L. Blackburn), 
 The Authorities of Stonyhurst College (1963), A Stonyhurst Handbook for Visitors and Others, (Stonyhurst, Lancashire), third edition, No ISBN
 Hewitson, A. (1878), Stonyhurst College, Present and Past: Its History, Discipline, Treasures and Curiosities, (Preston: The Chronicle office), second edition, No ISBN

External links

 Stonyhurst College website
 Stonyhurst's entry in the 1912 Catholic Encyclopaedia
 St Omers Press
 Stonyhurst Weather Station Meteogroup entry
 Stonyhurst Weather Station Met Office entry
 ISI Inspection Reports

 
 
Boarding schools in Lancashire
Catholic boarding schools in England
Jesuit universities and colleges in England
Jesuit secondary schools in England
Roman Catholic private schools in the Diocese of Salford
Private schools in Lancashire
International Baccalaureate schools in England
Member schools of the Headmasters' and Headmistresses' Conference
Co-educational boarding schools
1593 establishments in England
Educational institutions established in the 1590s
Grade I listed buildings in Lancashire
Grade I listed educational buildings
Grade II* listed parks and gardens in Lancashire
Forest of Bowland